Jacques Stroweis is a visual effects artist and computer scientist who began his career as a member of the New York Institute of Technology Computer Graphics Lab. He was nominated at the 67th Academy Awards in the category of Best Visual Effects for the film True Lies. He shared his nomination with John Bruno, Thomas L. Fisher and Patrick McClung.

Selected filmography

 Predator 2 (1990)
 Demolition Man (1993)
 Last Action Hero (1993)
 True Lies (1994)
 Species (1995)
 Broken Arrow (1996)
 The Covenant (2006)
 Ghost Rider (2007)
 Underworld: Rise of the Lycans (2009)
 Robosapien: Rebooted (2013)
 Dracula: The Dark Prince (2013)
 The Monkey King 2 (2016)

References

External links

NYIT Computer Graphics Lab, People Behind The Pixels 
 Cinefex No. 59, September 1994, "True Lies" 
 Rolling Stones, Issue 668, August 11, 1994, "True Lies"
"Intangible Biomorphs" Film & Mutoscope installation, Annecy Animation Film Festival, 1987 
"Spatial set operations on manifolds", Jacques.Stroweis and Pat Hanrahan, SIAM Conference on Geometric Modeling and Robotics, Albany, NY,1985
"Redefining Sculpture Digitally", Michael O'Rourke, CAT 2010 London Conference 
"Cones and Pillars series for Frank Stella" 

Living people
Special effects people
Visual effects supervisors
Computer graphics
Year of birth missing (living people)
New York Institute of Technology faculty